The 1999 NCAA Division III men's basketball tournament was the 25th annual single-elimination tournament to determine the national champions of National Collegiate Athletic Association (NCAA) men's Division III collegiate basketball in the United States.

The field contained sixty-four teams, and each program was allocated to one of four sectionals. All sectional games were played on campus sites, while the national semifinals, third-place final, and championship finals were contested at the Salem Civic Center in Salem, Virginia.

Defending champions Wisconsin–Platteville defeated Hampden-Sydney, 76–75 (in two overtimes), in the final, clinching a fourth overall title and a second consecutive championship.

The Pioneers (30–2) were coached by Bo Ryan, who claimed his fourth title at Platteville (1991, 1995, and 1998). Ryan departed for Division I Milwaukee after this season before eventually becoming the head coach for Wisconsin in 2001.

Merrill Brunson, also from Platteville, was named Most Outstanding Player.

Championship Rounds
Site: Salem Civic Center, Salem, Virginia

See also
1999 NCAA Division I men's basketball tournament
1999 NCAA Division II men's basketball tournament
1999 NCAA Division III women's basketball tournament
1999 NAIA Division I men's basketball tournament

References

NCAA Division III men's basketball tournament
NCAA Men's Division III Basketball
Ncaa Tournament